Sebastian Smith (3 October 1869 – 15 January 1948) was a British stage and film actor. He was born in Southwell, Nottinghamshire.

Filmography

 Rescued by Rover (1905)
 Prehistoric Peeps (1905)
 The Tramp's Dream (1906)
 The Blue Carbuncle (1923)
 White Cargo (1929)
 A Man of Mayfair (1931)
 Tilly of Bloomsbury (1931)
 Love Lies (1931) 
 The Double Event (1934)
 Virginia's Husband (1934)
 Badger's Green (1934)
 Public Nuisance No. 1 (1936)
 Oh, Mr Porter! (1937)
 London Melody (1937)
 Farewell to Cinderella (1937)
 Beauty and the Barge (1937)
 Museum Mystery (1937) 
 Where's That Fire? (1940)

References

External links

1869 births
1948 deaths
English male stage actors
English male film actors
People from Southwell, Nottinghamshire
20th-century English male actors